Keith Robert Biles JP is a British-born Falkland Islands banker and politician who has served as the Speaker of the Legislative Assembly of the Falkland Islands since his election in 2009.

Early life and career

Biles was born in the UK but moved to the Falkland Islands in 1995 as CEO of a branch of the Standard Chartered Bank. He retired from this position in 2002.

Political career

In June 2012, Biles launched Heroes Welcome in the Falklands. Heroes Welcome UK is an open-resource community partnership scheme, designed to encourage a show of support to members of the British Armed Forces.

In 2014, Biles was amongst those who bid farewell to the outgoing Governor of the Falkland Islands, Nigel Haywood. Haywood's last official act was presenting the Governor's sword to Biles for safekeeping until the next Governor arrived.

Personal life
He is married to the Rev. Kathy Biles, an Anglican cleric (ordained deacon in 2004 and priest in 2006) and Assistant at Christ Church Cathedral, Port Stanley.

References

Year of birth missing (living people)
Living people
Falkland Islands businesspeople
Speakers of the Legislative Assembly of the Falkland Islands
British emigrants to the Falkland Islands